Sugar Valley is an unincorporated community in Pleasants County, West Virginia, United States.  The community is located at the confluence of Sugar Creek and Middle Island Creek.

The community takes its name from nearby Sugar Creek.

References 

Unincorporated communities in West Virginia
Unincorporated communities in Pleasants County, West Virginia